The Marca-Tre-Spade was an Italian automobile manufactured from 1908 until 1911. The four-cylinder ioe 24 hp cars, with four-speed gearboxes, were the product of a well-known gunsmith.

References
David Burgess Wise, The New Illustrated Encyclopedia of Automobiles.

Defunct motor vehicle manufacturers of Italy